Quattro Strade is a village in Tuscany, central Italy, administratively a frazione of the comune of Bientina, province of Pisa. At the time of the 2001 census its population was 959.

Quattro Strade is about 26 km from Pisa and 4 km from Bientina.

References 

Frazioni of the Province of Pisa